James Liddell was a Scottish footballer who played in the 1880s.

Career
Liddell played club football in Scotland, joining Dumbarton where he was to spend the best part of six seasons.

Honours
Dumbarton
 Dumbartonshire Cup: Winners 1884-85
 Glasgow Charity Cup: Runners Up 1884-85
 4 representative caps for Dumbartonshire between 1884 and 1886, scoring one goal.

References

External links
 James Liddell (Dumbarton Football Club Historical Archive)

Scottish footballers
Dumbarton F.C. players
19th-century Scottish people
Year of birth missing
Year of death missing
Association football midfielders